Aghuzben (also Romanized as Āghūzben) is a village in Lafur Rural District, North Savadkuh County, Mazandaran Province, Iran. At the 2006 census, its population was 42, in 16 families.

References 

Populated places in Savadkuh County